The 4th Annual Latin Grammy Awards were held in Miami at the American Airlines Arena on Wednesday, September 3, 2003. It was the first time the telecast was held outside of Los Angeles. Juanes was the night's biggest winner winning a record five awards including Album of the Year. He tied his own record winning five awards again five years later in 2008. Juan Luis Guerra and Calle 13 also tied this record in 2007 and 2009 respectively.

Awards
Winners are in bold text.

General
Record of the Year

Juanes — "Es Por Ti"
Bacilos — "Mi Primer Millón"
Luis Miguel — "Hasta Que Vuelvas"
Molotov — "Frijolero"
Tribalistas — "Já Sei Namorar"

Album of the Year

Juanes — Un Día Normal
Bacilos — Caraluna
Rubén Blades — Mundo
Alexandre Pires — Estrella Guía
Tribalistas — Tribalistas

Song of the Year

Juanes — "Es Por Ti"
Jorge Villamizar — "Caraluna"  (Bacilos)
Natalia Lafourcade — "En El 2000"
Sergio George and Jorge Villamizar — "Mi Primer Millón"  (Bacilos)
Franco De Vita — "Tal Vez"  (Ricky Martin)

Best New Artist

David Bisbal
Tiziano Ferro
Natalia Lafourcade
Fernanda Porto
Álex Ubago

Pop
Best Female Pop Vocal Album

Olga Tañón  — Sobrevivir 
Gisselle  — En Alma, Cuerpo y Corazón
Ednita Nazario — Acústico
Thalía  — Thalía
Ana Torroja — Frágil 

Best Male Pop Vocal Album

Enrique Iglesias — Quizás
Ricardo Arjona — Santo Pecado
David Bisbal  — Corazón Latino
Alexandre Pires  — Estrella Guía
Joan Manuel Serrat  — Versos En La Boca

Best Pop Album by a Duo/Group with Vocals

Bacilos — Caraluna
Ilegales  — Marca Registrada
Ketama  — Dame La Mano
Las Ketchup — Hijas del Tomate
A.B. Quintanilla & Los Kumbia Kings  — 4

Best Pop Instrumental Album

Bajofondo Tango Club — Bajofondo Tango Club
Raúl di Blasio  — Di Blasio-Gardel Tango
Orquestra Simfònica de Barcelona I Nacional de Catalunya  — Historia Sinfonica del Pop Español
Spam Allstars  — ¡Fuacata! Live
Néstor Torres — Mi Alma Latina

Rap/Hip-Hop
Best Rap/Hip-Hop Album

Orishas — Emigrante
Big Boy — The Phenomenon 
Tego Calderón — El Abayarde
Dante  — Elevado
El General  — El General De Fiesta 
Vico C — Emboscada

Rock
Best Rock Solo Vocal Album

Juanes — Un Día Normal
Gustavo Cerati — Siempre es hoy
Charly García — Influencia 
Natalia Lafourcade — Natalia Lafourcade
Luis Alberto Spinetta — Obras En Vivo

Best Rock Album by a Duo/Group with Vocals

Maná — Revolución de Amor
Jaguares — El Primer Instinto
Jarabe de Palo — Bonito 
Molotov  — Dance and Dense Denso
Los Rabanes  — Money Pa' Que

Best Rock Song

Juanes — "Mala Gente"
Beto Cuevas and Humberto Gatica — "Amate y Salvate"  (La Ley)
Natalia Lafourcade — "En El 2000"
Paco Ayala, Randy Ebright and Miguel Huidobro  — "Frijolero"  (Molotov)
Shakira — "Te Aviso, Te Anuncio (Tango)"

Tropical
Best Salsa Album

El Gran Combo de Puerto Rico — 40 Aniversario En Vivo  
Oscar D'León — Infinito
La India — Latin Song Bird: Mi Alma y Corazón
Víctor Manuelle  — Le Preguntaba A La Luna 
Gilberto Santa Rosa — Viceversa

Best Merengue Album

Milly Quezada — Pienso Así... 
Elvis Crespo — Urbano 
Grupo Manía  — Latino 
Los Hermanos Rosario — Swing A Domicilio
Kinito Méndez  — Sigo Siendo El Hombre Merengue 

Best Contemporary Tropical Album

Rubén Blades — Mundo 
Charanga Habanera  — Live In The USA 
Ry Cooder and Manuel Galbán  — Mambo Sinuendo
Juan Formell and Los Van Van — En El Malecón De La Habana
Monchy y Alexandra  — Confesiones...

Best Traditional Tropical Album

Ibrahim Ferrer — Buenos Hermanos 
The Mambo All Stars Orchestra  — 50 Years of Mambo 
Polo Montañez — Guitarra Mía
Eliades Ochoa — Estoy Como Nunca 
Plena Libre  — Mi Ritmo

Best Tropical Song

Sergio George and Jorge Villamizar — "Mi Primer Millón"  (Bacilos)
Elvis Crespo — "Bandida"
Sergio George and Jorge Luis Piloto — "La Salsa Vive"  (Tito Nieves)
Kike Santander — "Por Más Que Intento"  (Gilberto Santa Rosa)
Ray Contreras, Jimmy Greco, La India and Shirley Marte — "Sedúceme"  (La India)

Regional Mexican
Best Ranchero Album

Vicente Fernández — 35 Aniversario — Lo Mejor de Lara 
Pepe Aguilar — Y Tenerte Otra Vez
Rocío Dúrcal — Rocío Dúrcal... En Concierto Inólvidable 
Alejandro Fernández  — Niña Amada Mía 
Pedro Fernández — De Corazón

Best Banda Album

Joan Sebastian — Afortunado 
Banda Centenario  — Homenaje a un Amigo 
Banda el Recodo  — No Me Sé Rajar 
Banda Machos — Banda Machos
Cuisillos de Arturo Macias — ...No Voy a Llorar 

Best Grupero Album

Atrapado  — ¿Qué Sentiras? 
Alondra  — Alondra 
Ivan Díaz  — Historias
Límite  — Soy Así 
Jennifer Peña — Libre 

Best Tejano Album

Jimmy González & El Grupo Mazz — Si Me Faltas Tu  
Jaime & Los Chamacos  — Conjunto Power 
Emilio Navaira  — Acuérdate 
Jay Perez  — Hombre En La Luna
Ruben Ramos & The Revolution  — El Gato Negro On The Prowl

Best Norteño Album

Los Terribles del Norte  — La Tercera Es La Vencida... Eso! 
Juan Acuña & El Terror del Norte  — Pa' Toda Mi Raza...Eso!
Conjunto Primavera  — Perdoname Mi Amor
Los Tucanes de Tijuana  — Jugo A La Vida 
Pesado  — No Te La Vas A Acabar!

Best Regional Mexican Song

Joan Sebastian — "Afortunado"
A.B. Quintanilla and Alicia Villarreal — "Ay! Papacito"  (Límite)
Jimmy González — "Dame Un Minuto"  (Jimmy González & El Grupo Mazz)
Noe Hernández, Alfonso Lizárraga and Joel Lizárraga — "Las Vías Del Amor"  (Banda el Recodo)
Ramón González Mora — "Perdóname Mi Amor"  (Conjunto Primavera)

Traditional
Best Folk Album

 Mercedes Sosa — Acústico 
Alex Acuña and Eva Ayllón with Los Hijos Del Sol —  To My Country 
Eva Ayllón — Eva 
Los Muñequitos de Matanzas  — Rumba De Corazón 
Raíces Habaneras  — Raíces Habaneras 

Best Tango Album

Sexteto Mayor — Homenaje A Piazzolla  
Adrián Iaies Trio  — Las Cosas Tienen Movimiento
Adriana Nano y Los Bandoneones de Buenos Aires  — Adriana Nano y Los Bandoneones de Buenos Aires
Orquesta Del Tango De La Ciudad De Buenos Aires — En Vivo En El Colón
Susana Rinaldi — La Rosa En Ginebra 
Leo Sujatovich  — Trío De Cámara Tangos

Best Flamenco Album

Pepe de Lucía — El Corazón De Mi Gente 
Juan Carmona  — Orillas
Diego El Cigala with Niño Josele — Teatro Real De Madrid 
Carmen Linares with Gerardo Núñez Trio  — Un Ramito De Locura 
José Mercé — Lío 
Victor Monge Serranito with Camerata Romeu  — Sueños De Ida y Vuelta
Various Artists — Gerardo Núñez Presenta La Nueva Escuela De Guitarra Flamenca

Jazz
Best Latin Jazz Album

Paquito D'Rivera — Brazilian Dreams 
Alex Acuña and Justo Almario with Tolú —  Bongó De Van Gogh
Gato Barbieri — The Shadow of the Cat
Eddie Palmieri — La Perfecta II 
Esperança  Hermeto Pascoal E Grupo  — Mundo Verde
Chucho Valdés — Fantásia Cubana

Christian 
Best Christian Album

Marcos Witt — Sana Nuestra Tierra
Patty Cabrera  — Amar A Alguien Como Yo
Funky  — Funkytown
Annette Moreno & Jardín — Un Ángel Llora 
Perucho  — Almas Unidas

Brazilian
Best Brazilian Contemporary Pop Album

Tribalistas — Tribalistas
Gilberto Gil — Kaya N'Gan Daya - Ao Vivo
Kid Abelha  — Acústico MTV
Milton Nascimento — Pietá
Caetano Veloso  — Live in Bahia 

Best Brazilian Rock Album

Os Paralamas do Sucesso — Longo Caminho
Capital Inicial — Rosas e Vinho Tinto
Charlie Brown Jr. — Bocas Ordinárias
CPM 22 — Chegou a Hora de Recomeçar
Cássia Eller — Dez de Dezembro
Nação Zumbi — Nação Zumbi

Best Samba/Pagode Album

Alcione — Ao Vivo
Leandro Braga — Primeira Dama - A Música de Dona Ivone Lara
Teresa Cristina and Grupo Semente — A Música de Paulinho da Viola
Martinho da Vila — Voz e Coração
Jair Rodrigues — Intérprete

Best MPB Album

Caetano Veloso and Jorge Mautner — Eu Não Peço Desculpa
Maria Bethânia — Maricotinha ao Vivo
João Bosco  — Malabaristas do Sinal Vermelho 
Dori Caymmi  — Contemporâneos
Gal Costa — Gal Bossa Tropical
Elza Soares — Do Cóccix Até o Pescoço

Best Sertaneja Music Album

Zezé di Camargo & Luciano — Zezé di Camargo e Luciano
Bruno & Marrone — Minha Vida Minha Musica
Chitãozinho & Xororó — Festa do Interior
Edson & Hudson — Acústico ao Vivo
Gian & Giovani — Gian and Giovani
Milionario and José Rico — O Dono do Mundo
Comitiva Brasil — 100% Sertanejo

Best Brazilian Roots/Regional Album

Dominguinhos — Chegando de Mansinho
Fafá de Belém — O Canto das Águas
Elomar, Pena Branca, Renato Teixeira, Teca Calazans and Xangai — Cantoria Brasileira
Olodum — Pela Vida
Pena Branca — Pena Branca Canta Xavantinho

Best Brazilian Song

Milton Nascimento and Telo Borges — "Tristesse" (Milton Nascimento and Maria Rita)
Herbert Vianna — "Cuide Bem do Seu Amor"  (Os Paralamas do Sucesso)
Arnaldo Antunes, Carlinhos Brown and Marisa Monte — "Já Sei Namorar"  (Tribalistas)
Chico Amaral — "Pietá"  (Milton Nascimento)
Jorge Mautner — "Todo Errado"  (Caetano Veloso and Jorge Mautner)

Children's
Best Latin Children's Album
 
Xuxa — Só Para Baixinhos 3
Cómplices Al Rescate — Cómplices Al Rescate: El Gran Final 
Beatriz Contreras, Lila Jaramillo and Orlando Sandoval  — Carta Al Niño Dios
Tatiana — Los Mejores Temas de las Películas de Walt Disney
Various Artists — Canciones de Gozo Para Niños

Classical
Best Classical Album

Paquito D'Rivera — Historia del soldado
Jordi Savall and Capella Reial de Catalunya — Biber: Requiem Á 15 Battalia Á 10
Maria Teresa Madeira  — Ernesto Nazareth 2 - Mestres Brasileiros Vol IV 
Ángeles Blancas, Plácido Domingo, Elisabete Matos, García Navarro, Àngel Òdena, Stefano Palatchi, and María Rey-Joly — Margarita La Tornera .... 
Kronos Quartet — Nuevo

Production
Best Engineered Album

Benny Faccone and Paul McKenna — Revolución de Amor (Maná)
Mike Couzzi and Sebastian Krys — Money Pa' Que (Los Rabanes)
Walter Flores, Oscar Marín, Daniela Pastore and Edín Solís — Mundo (Rubén Blades)
William Jr., Antoine Midani and Alê Siqueira — Tribalistas (Tribalistas)
Rolando Alejandro, Dominic Barbera, Jon Fausty, Brian Kinkead, José Lugo, Arturo Ortiz, Rei Peña, Pedro Rivera Toledo and Ronnie Torres — Viceversa (Gilberto Santa Rosa)

Producer of the Year

Bebu Silvetti
Sergio George
Guto Graça Mello
Luis Fernando Ochoa
Gustavo Santaolalla

Music Video
Best Music Video
Molotov — "Frijolero"
Ricardo Arjona — "El Problema"
Chayanne — "Torero"
Roberto Frejat —  "Segredos"
Jarabe de Palo — "Bonito"

References

Latin Grammy Awards by year
2003 music awards
2003 in Florida
2003 in Latin music
September 2003 events in the United States